Albert Aley (April 25, 1919 - January 1, 1986) was an American producer, screenwriter, script doctor and story editor.

Aley began his career, as an actor on the radio series Let's Pretend. Later in his career, Aley worked on radio and wrote for two episodes for the television series Treasury Men in Action. He later was an producer, screenwriter and script editor for Tom Corbett, Space Cadet. His other credits includes, Ironside, The Paper Chase, Hawaii Five-O, Quincy, M.E., Have Gun – Will Travel, and Rawhide. In 1971, Aley was nominated for an Primetime Emmy Award for Outstanding Series - Drama. He retired in 1981.

Aley died in January 1986 at the Seattle Hospital in Seattle, Washington, at the age of 66.

References

External links 

Rotten Tomatoes profile

1919 births
1986 deaths
Television producers from New York (state)
Screenwriters from New York (state)
American television writers
American screenwriters
American television producers
American male screenwriters
American male television writers
20th-century American screenwriters